
Hisa may refer to:

People with the given name
, Japanese actress
Hisa Sasagi (born 1987), Samoan rugby union player
, Japanese suffragist and politician
, Japanese poet, activist and politician
Hisa Nagano (1865 - 1901) Japanese nurse

People with the surname
, Japanese aikidoka
Asuka Hisa, Los Angeles-based artist, educator and curator.

Other uses
Hisa, a fictional alien species in C. J. Cherryh's Alliance–Union universe

See also
Sachiko, Princess Hisa (1927–1928), Japanese princess
Health Informatics Service Architecture

Japanese feminine given names
Japanese-language surnames